A spring house, or springhouse, is a small building, usually of a single room, constructed over a spring.  While the original purpose of a springhouse was to keep the spring water clean by excluding fallen leaves, animals, etc., the enclosing structure was also used for refrigeration before the advent of ice delivery and, later, electric refrigeration.  The water of the spring maintains a constant cool temperature inside the spring house throughout the year.  Food that would otherwise spoil, such as meat, fruit, or dairy products, could be kept there, safe from animal depredations as well. Springhouses thus often also served as pumphouses, milkhouses, and root cellars.

The Tomahawk Spring spring house at Tomahawk, West Virginia, was listed on the National Register of Historic Places in 1994.

Gallery

See also
Ice house (building)
Smokehouse
Windcatcher

References

External links

House types
Cooling technology
Food preservation
Semi-subterranean structures
Springs (hydrology)
Vernacular architecture